Saint-Denis-de-Brompton is a municipality in the Canadian province of Quebec, part of the Regional County Municipality of Le Val-Saint-François, within the larger administrative region of Estrie. It is located approximately 145 kilometres east of Montreal. The municipality is located in a densely wooded area on the shores of Lake Brompton.

History
The region was still little frequented at the beginning of the 19th century when the township of Brompton was proclaimed in 1801 on the lands of the county of Buckinghamshire. The parish of Saint-Denis-de-Brompton was founded in this township in 1922. Its name pays homage to Father Joseph-Denis Bellemare, parish priest of Saint-François-Xavier-de-Brompton. On March 6, 1935, the parish municipality of Saint-Denis-de-Brompton was created by detachment of the municipalities of Brompton, Orford, Saint-François-Xavier-de-Brompton and Saint-Élie-d'Orford. The parish was canonically erected in 1940.

On November 17, 2012, Saint-Denis-de-Brompton changed status from parish municipality to municipality. Nowadays, Saint-Denis-de-Brompton is an important vacation resort in the region, in particular because of the lakes found there.

In 2021, following a referendum, the city put forward a project to install water and sewers in the Petit lac Brompton and Lac Desmarais sectors. This project includes, among other things, a loan of $31M.

Demographics

Population

Private dwellings occupied by usual residents: 1838 (total dwellings: 2095)

Language
All official government actions take place in French, the official language of Quebec. French is the primary language spoken in Saint-Denis-de-Brompton, though some people, especially those who deal often with tourists, are able to speak and understand English. 
 Mother tongue:
 English as first language: 2.2%
 French as first language: 95.3%
 English and French as first language: 1.2%
 Other as first language: 1.1%

Government

Saint-Denis-de-Brompton forms part of the federal electoral district of Richmond—Arthabaska and has been represented by Alain Rayes, an independent MP, since 2015. Provincially, Saint-Denis-de-Brompton is part of the Richmond electoral district and is represented by André Bachand of the Coalition Avenir Québec since 2018.

The current mayor of Saint-Denis-de-Brompton is Denis Veilleux. The mayor and a five-member city council are the elected officials of the municipality.

Education
Sherbrooke's Elementary School and High School (of the Eastern Townships School Board) serves English-speaking students in this community for both elementary and secondary levels.

Tourism
The church of Saint-Denis-de-Brompton has stained glass windows made by a group of citizens assisted by a master glazier made from Claude Lafortune's paper church.

Twin towns
Saint-Denis-de-Brompton is not yet twinned with any town.

See also
List of municipalities in Quebec

References

External links

Municipalities in Quebec
Incorporated places in Estrie